City of Ghosts is a 2017 Arabic-language American documentary film about the Syrian media activist group Raqqa Is Being Slaughtered Silently as they face the realities of life undercover, on the run, and in exile after their homeland is taken over by ISIS in 2014. The film was directed by Oscar-nominated and Emmy Award-winning filmmaker Matthew Heineman (Cartel Land).

Heineman won the Outstanding Directorial Achievement in Documentary Award from the Directors Guild of America for the film, becoming one of only three people to win the prestigious honor twice. City of Ghosts also won the Courage Under Fire Award from the International Documentary Association "in recognition of conspicuous bravery in the pursuit of truth" and was listed on over 20 critic and year-end lists for Best Documentary of 2017. City of Ghosts was nominated for the Primetime Emmy Award for Exceptional Merit in Documentary Filmmaking, BAFTA Award, PGA Award, IDA Award for Best Documentary Features.

Release
The film premiered at the 2017 Sundance Film Festival. It was subsequently acquired by Amazon in a $2 million deal.

The film was released theatrically by Amazon Studios, A&E IndieFilms and IFC Films on July 14, 2017.

Reception
City of Ghosts received critical acclaim upon release. , the film holds a 98% 'fresh' rating on Rotten Tomatoes, based on 105 reviews, with an average rating of 8.40/10. The website's critical consensus reads, "City of Ghosts takes a hard-hitting, ground-level look at atrocities in a part of the world that may seem foreign to many viewers, but whose impact will be no less devastating." On Metacritic, it holds a rating of 86/100, based on 31 reviews, indicating "universal acclaim". Charlie Phillips of The Guardian gave the film five stars and called it "the definitive contemporary documentary about the tragedy of Syria."

Awards and nominations

References

External links
 
 
 
 
 Official trailer

2017 films
2017 documentary films
American documentary films
Documentary films about jihadism
Documentary films about journalism
Documentary films about the Internet
2010s Arabic-language films
Sundance Film Festival award winners
2010s American films
Films directed by Matthew Heineman